The Men's 30 kilometre pursuit event of the FIS Nordic World Ski Championships 2015 was held on 21 February 2015.

Results
The race started at 14:30.

References

Men's 30 kilometre pursuit